Anna of Byzantium may refer to:

 Anna of Constantinople (disambiguation)
 Anna of Savoy (1306–1365), Byzantine Empress consort
 Anna Comnena and the Alexiad
 Anna from Byzantium, a Greek noblewoman or princess who became princess of Halych
 Anna of Byzantium (novel), a 1999 novel by Tracy Barrett